Preparation is a ghost town in Monona County, in the U.S. state of Iowa.

History
Preparation was founded in 1853 by a schismatic Latter Day Saint sect led by Charles B. Thompson. The community was named from their belief that life on Earth was a preparation for the afterlife. A post office was established at Preparation in 1854, and remained in operation until it was discontinued in 1904.

The site of Preparation is now a part of Preparation Canyon State Park.

References

Geography of Monona County, Iowa
Ghost towns in Iowa
Populated places established in 1853
1853 establishments in Iowa